Afroblemma is a monotypic genus of African araneomorph spiders in the family Tetrablemmidae containing the single species, Afroblemma thorelli. It was first described by Pekka T. Lehtinen in 1981, and is found in Africa.

See also
 List of Tetrablemmidae species

References

Monotypic Araneomorphae genera
Spiders of Africa
Taxa named by Pekka T. Lehtinen
Tetrablemmidae